Hubert Walter (April 14, 1930 — December 6, 2008) was a German anthropologist and human biologist.

Born in Berlin, he did a Ph.D. from the University of Kiel in 1953 and worked at various positions at the University of Münster, University of Mainz and University of Bremen. He taught anthropology at the University of Mainz from 1962 to 1974. From 1974 to until his retirement in 1995, he was a professor of anthropology and human biology at the University of Bremen. He received several honors and honorary memberships from various universities and anthropological organizations, including an honorary doctorate from the University of Athens in 1998 and an honorary membership from the European Anthropological Association in 2008. Along with anthropology, genetics and serology, his research interests also included the history of science.

He died at the age of 78 years because of the consequential complications from a stroke that had occurred to him 11 months earlier from his death.

Early life and family
Walter was born to Hilde and Helmut Walter on 14 April 1930 at Charlottenburg in Berlin, Germany. His father was a painter. In 1934, the family moved to Einbeck, where at the Goethe School in 1950, he completed his Abitur. He married Heide Krüger in 1954. She was his former schoolmate, and she died in 1995. They had 3 sons and 1 daughter, namely Erk, Kai, Jörn and Vibeke.

Education and academic career
From 1950 to 1953, Walter studied anthropology, biology, pre and early history, and psychology at the University of Kiel. On 18 July 1953, he completed his Ph.D. from the University of Kiel under the supervision of Hans Weinert. The subject of his doctoral dissertation was "Investigations Into the Inheritance of the Above-average or Below-average Height of Small and School Children". From 1955 to 1958, he worked at the University of Münster's Institute of Human Genetics as a guest assistant. In 1958, he became a research assistant of Egon Freiherr von Eickstedt at the University of Mainz's Institute for Anthropology. In 1962, he qualified for professorship from the university's Faculty of Natural Sciences for his social anthropological study on the populace of Ruhr.

He worked at the Faculty of Natural Sciences of the University of Mainz as an associate professor from 23 August 1966 to 29 April 1971 and as a professor from 30 April 1971 to 1973. From 1971 to 1973, he was also designated as a scientific councilor at the university, and from 1973 to 1974, he served as the head of the university's Department of Anthropology.

He went to India twice as a visiting fellow at the Andhra University and the University of Delhi in 1972 and 1982, respectively. From 1974 to 1995, he worked at the University of Bremen as a professor of anthropology and human biology, and retired in 1995. From 1977 to 2008, he was the editor of Anthropologischer Anzeiger and had also served as the editor-in-chief of the journal.

Research
The prime areas of focus for his studies had been general anthropology, social anthropology, population biology, population genetics, serology, and history of science.

He also did research on the Indian peoples' genetic variability with respect to the country's ethno–social, regional, and linguistic structure.

Honors and memberships
He received a fellowship from the Indian Anthropological Association in 1982. In 1990, the József Attila University gave him the Lajos Bartucz Medal. In 1991, the Slovak Association of Anthropology granted him an honorary membership, and in 1993, The Asiatic Society gave him a medal named after Thomas Nelson Annandale. He was given a "golden medal" by the Comenius University in 1994. In 1998, he was esteemed with an honorary doctorate by the University of Athens's Faculty of Medicine. In 2005 and 2008, he received honorary memberships from the German Association of Anthropology and European Anthropological Association, respectively.

In 2013, the German Anthropological Society gave an award named after Hubert Walter to Jan Novacek, a biological anthropologist and an anatomist, for his "outstanding performance in the field of physical anthropology".

Death
On 2 January 2008, Walter had a stroke and later on 6 December 2008, he died due to the complications that had resulted from that stroke.

Works

Books

Selected papers

See also
Edward Eyre Hunt Jr.

References

University of Kiel alumni
Academic staff of Johannes Gutenberg University Mainz
Academic staff of the University of Bremen
Physical anthropologists
Medical anthropologists
German anthropologists
Anthropology educators
Anthropology writers
21st-century anthropologists
1930 births

2008 deaths